Cratera viridimaculata is a species of land planarian found in Argentina.

Description 
The color of the dorsum is light olive green covered with dark gray fine spots. The ventral side is whitish and the margins on both dorsal and ventral sides are gray.

The several eyes of C. viridimaculata are distributed marginally in the first millimeters of the body and posteriorly become dorsal, occupying around 30% of the body width just before the region of the pharynx.

Etymology 
The specific epithet viridimaculata comes from Latin viridis, green + maculata, spotted, and refers to the dorsal pigmentation of the body.

Distribution 
Cratera viridimaculata is found in the Interior Atlantic Forest, Misiones province, Argentina, an area covered by subtropical forests. It occurs in two natural reserves, Esmeralda Provincial Park and the San Antonio Strict Nature Reserve.

References 

Geoplanidae
Invertebrates of Argentina
Animals described in 2016